Prasophyllum pictum is a species of orchid endemic to New South Wales. It has a single tubular, shiny dark green leaf and up to twenty two scented brown, pink, purple and white flowers. It is only known from three subpopulations on the Northern Tablelands.

Description
The flowers are sweetly scented and are white with brown, pink and purple tones. As with others in the genus, the flowers are inverted so that the labellum is above the column rather than below it. There is an egg-shaped to wedge-shaped yellow callus with a dark green base in the centre of the labellum and extending well past the bend. Flowering occurs between late November and late December.

Taxonomy and naming
Prasophyllum pictum was first formally described in 2018 by David Jones and Lachlan Copeland from a specimen collected near Ebor and the description was published in Australian Orchid Review. The specific epithet (pictum) is derived from the Latin word pictus meaning "painted" or "colored", referring to the colourful flowers of this leek orchid.

Distribution and habitat
It is only known from three subpopulations containing a total of about 200 plants near Ebor.

References

pictum
Orchids of New South Wales
Endemic orchids of Australia
Plants described in 2018